Reagan's In is the 1981 debut album by the Los Angeles punk band Wasted Youth. The cover art was drawn by Pushead.

Track listing 
 "Reagan's In" - 1:03
 "Problem Child" - 2:07
 "Teenage Nark" - 0:53
 "Uni-High Beefrag" - 1:03
 "Born Deprived" - 1:36
 "Fuck Authority" - 1:41
 "You're a Jerk" - 0:54
 "We Were on Heroin" - 1:07
 "Punk for a Day" - 1:37
 "Flush the Bouncers" - 1:15

Personnel
Danny Spira - vocals
Chett Lehrer - guitar
Jeff Long - bass
Allen Stiritz - drums

Trivia
Pushead's original drawing for the record was of Charles Manson with the swastika on the forehead. It was changed to Reagan without Pushead's consent.

See also

Ronald Reagan in music

References

1981 albums
Wasted Youth (American band) albums